Ernestine is a feminine given name. Ernest is the male counterpart of this name. Notable people with the name include:

 Ernestine Anderson (1928–2016), American jazz and blues singer
 Ernestine Bayer (1909–2006), American athlete
 Ernestine Bazemore, American politician
 Ernestine Gilbreth Carey (1908–2006), American author
 Ernestine Cannon (1904–1969), American ceramicist
 Ernestine Carter (1906–1983), American journalist
 Ernestine Chassebœuf (1910–c.2005), French letter-writer
 Ernestine Cobern Beyer (1893–1972), American poet and author
 Ernestine Eckstein (1941–1992), American LGBT activist
 Ernestine Fuchs (1885–1962), German film actress, film producer, and screenwriter
 Ernestine Fu, American venture capital investor and author
 Ernestine de Lambriquet (1778–1813) was the adopted/foster daughter of King Louis XVI and Queen Marie Antoinette of France.
 Ernestine Leibovici (1918–1988), more commonly known as Eren Eyüboğlu, Romanian-born Turkish painter and mosaic artist.
 Ernestine Rengiil, Palauan lawyer
 Ernestine Rose (1810–1892), Russian-American abolitionist and feminist
 Ernestine Rose (1880–1961), American librarian
 Ernestine Jane Geraldine Russell (1921-2011), American actress, singer and model
 Ernestine Schumann-Heink (1861–1936), Austrian-German-American operatic contralto

Fictional characters
 Ernestine Tomlin, a fictional telephone company operator portrayed by Lily Tomlin
 Ernestine, a character in Dorothy Cannell's book The Importance of Being Ernestine
 Ernestine, the title character in L'Histoire d'Ernestine, a short novel from the 18th century written by Marie-Jeanne Riccoboni
 Ernestine, a character on Sesame Street

See also
 Ernestine branch, a branch of the German House of Wettin
 Ernestine, a comic-opera by Choderlos de Laclos

Feminine given names
German feminine given names